The Spirit of '98 is a 1928 bronze sculpture by an unknown artist, installed on the Ohio Statehouse grounds in Columbus, Ohio, United States.

Description and history
It rests on a square cream colored stone base with plaques on three sides. The sculpture and plaques are patinated and have metal highlights.

The statue was installed outside the Ohio Statehouse in 1930. George Wright restored the artwork between 1989 and 1992. It was surveyed by the Smithsonian Institution's "Save Outdoor Sculpture!" program in 1994.

References

External links

 
 

1928 establishments in Ohio
1928 sculptures
Bronze sculptures in Ohio
Downtown Columbus, Ohio
Monuments and memorials in Ohio
Ohio Statehouse
Outdoor sculptures in Columbus, Ohio
Sculptures of men in Ohio
Statues in Columbus, Ohio